The 2008–09 season was Deportivo de La Coruña's 38th season in La Liga, the top division of Spanish football. The season covered the period 1 July 2008 to 30 June 2009.

Players

Squad
Retrieved on 25 March 2021

Out on loan

Transfers

In

Out

Squad stats 
Last updated on 26 March 2021.

|-
|colspan="14"|Players who have left the club after the start of the season:

|}

Season results

Pre-season

La Liga

League table

Positions by round

Matches

Copa del Rey

Round of 32

Deportivo La Coruña won 4–0 on aggregate

Round of 16

Sevilla won 5–1 on aggregate

UEFA Intertoto Cup

Third round

Deportivo La Coruña won 3–1 on aggregate

UEFA Cup

Qualifying rounds

Deportivo La Coruña won 2–0 on aggregate

First round

2–2 on aggregate. Deportivo La Coruña won 3–2 on penalties

Group H

Final phase

AaB won 6–1 on aggregate

Coaching staff

References

See also
2008–09 La Liga
2008–09 Copa del Rey
2008 UEFA Intertoto Cup
2008–09 UEFA Cup

External links 
  
Unofficial Spanish fansite 
Another unofficial Spanish fansite 
Official international website
Official international forum
Polish site 
Unofficial arabic fansite
Unofficial Turkey Fan
Unofficial Russian Fan

Deportivo de La Coruna
Deportivo de La Coruña seasons